Nagnechiya Maa (Nagnechi Ma, Nagnechia Ma) is the kuldevi of the Rathore Rajput & sodha rajpurohit community in India.

Nāgas
Regional Hindu goddesses
Animal goddesses